Veronica Kelly is an Australian team handball player (born 1985). She plays on the Australian national team, and participated at the 2011 World Women's Handball Championship in Brazil. Her sister is also in the team and her brother represents the national men's team.

References

1985 births
Living people
Australian female handball players